This is a comprehensive list of victories of the  cycling team. The races are categorised according to the UCI Continental Circuits rules.

1982 – Termolan

No recorded wins

1983 – Termolan

No recorded wins

1984 – Santini

No recorded wins

1985 – Santini
Milano–Torino, Daniele Caroli
Giro di Campania, Daniele Caroli
Stage 1 Giro di Puglia, Daniele Caroli
Gorla Minore Cyclo-cross, Claudio Fasolo

1986 – Santini
Stage 5b Settimana Siciliana, Jesper Worre
 Overall Tour of Denmark, Jesper Worre

1987 – Selca

 Young rider classification Giro d'Italia, Roberto Conti

1988 – Selca
Stage 17 Giro d'Italia, Patrizio Gambirasio

1989 – Selca

No recorded wins

1990 – Italbonifica–Navigare
Stage 6 Settimana Siciliana, William Dazzani
Stage 3 Giro di Puglia, Michele Moro
Stages 4a & 8 Giro d'Italia, Stefano Allocchio

1991 – Italbonifica–Navigare
Stage 2 Settimana Ciclistica Lombarda, Sergio Carcano

1992 – Italbonifica–Navigare
Coppa Sabatini, Stefano Zanini

1993 – Navigare–Blue Storm
Stage 3 Settimana Ciclistica Lombarda, Roberto Pagnin
Stages 4 & 6 Settimana Ciclistica Lombarda, Fabiano Fontanelli
Stage 7 Settimana Ciclistica Lombarda, Fabrizio Settembrini
Stage 11 Giro d'Italia, Fabiano Fontanelli
 National Road Race Championship, Massimo Podenzana
Stage 5 Tour de Pologne, Fabiano Fontanelli
Stage 7 Tour de Pologne, Walter Castignola

1994 – Navigare–Blue Storm
Giro dell'Etna, Stefano Zanini
Stage 5 Tirreno–Adriatico, Stefano Zanini
Stage 8 Tirreno–Adriatico, Roberto Pagnin
Stage 22 Giro d'Italia, Stefano Zanini
 National Road Race Championship, Massimo Podenzana
Stage 3 Tour de Pologne, Walter Castignola

1995 – Navigare–Blue Storm
Stages 1 & 6 Settimana Ciclistica Lombarda, Giuseppe Guerini
Stage 10 Tour DuPont, Vassili Davidenko

1996 – Scrigno–Blue Storm

Stages 2, 4 & 5 Regio-Tour, Filippo Casagrande
Gran Premio di Lugano, Amilcare Tronca
Tre Valli Varesine, Fabrizio Guidi
Overall Danmark Rundt, Fabrizio Guidi
Stage 3, Fabrizio Guidi
Grand Prix of Aargau Canton, Fabrizio Guidi
Gran Premio Industria e Commercio di Prato, Fabrizio Guidi
Gran Premio della Costa Etruschi, Fabrizio Guidi
Points classification in the Giro d'Italia, Fabrizio Guidi
Stage 3 Tour de Suisse, Cristian Gasperoni
Stages 1 & 14 Vuelta a España, Biagio Conte

1997 – Scrigno–Gaerne

Gran Premio Industria e Commercio Artigianato Carnaghese, Francesco Secchiari
Stage 4a Euskal Bizikleta, Fabrizio Guidi
Stage 3a Driedaagse van De Panne, Fabrizio Guidi
Gran Premio della Costa Etruschi, Biagio Conte
Stage 2 Tirreno–Adriatico, Davide Casarotto
Coppa Ugo Agostoni, Massimo Apollonio

1998 – Scrigno–Gaerne

Stages 4 & 9 Tour de Langkawi, Mirko Rossato
Stage 6 Tour de Langkawi, Alessandro Petacchi
Stage 8 Tour de Langkawi, Dario Pieri
Stage 12 Tour de Langkawi, Luca Cei
Stage 1 Tirreno–Adriatico, Gabriele Balducci
Stage 1 Driedaagse van De Panne, Dario Pieri
Stage 6 Tour de Suisse, Vladimir Duma
 Road Race Championships, Vladimir Duma
Stage 7 Tour of Austria, Mirko Rossato
Giro di Toscana, Francesco Secchiari

1999 – Navigare–Gaerne

Stages 2 & 7 Tour de Langkawi, Enrico Degano
Stage 12 Tour de Langkawi, Luca Cei
Giro del Lago Maggiore, Gabriele Balducci
Stage 1 Tour of Slovenia, Gabriele Balducci
Stage 3 Tour of Slovenia, Enrico Degano
Stage 4 Tour of Slovenia, Dario Pieri
Stage 5 Giro d'Abruzzo, Vladimir Duma

2000 – Ceramica Panaria–Gaerne

Stage 10 Tour de Langkawi, Julio Alberto Pérez
Stage 3 Settimana Internazionale di Coppi e Bartali, Enrico Degano
Stage 2 Giro d'Abruzzo, Vladimir Duma
Stage 2 GP Jornal de Noticias, Enrico Degano
Stage 6 Tour of Austria, Gerrit Glomser
Stage 4 Tour of Sweden, Nathan O'Neill
 Road Race Championships, Vladimir Duma
Trofeo Matteotti, Yauheni Seniushkin
Trofeo dello Scalatore II, Julio Alberto Pérez

2001 – Ceramiche Panaria–Fiordo

Stages 2 & 5 Tour de Langkawi, Enrico Degano
Stage 10 Tour de Langkawi, Nathan O'Neill
Stage 1 Circuit des Mines, Sergiy Matveyev
Stage 13 Giro d'Italia, Julio Alberto Pérez
Giro del Veneto, Giuliano Figueras

2002 – Ceramiche Panaria–Fiordo

 Time Trial Championships, Nathan O'Neill
Stage 3 Tour de Langkawi, Enrico Degano
Stages 6 & 10 Tour de Langkawi, Graeme Brown
Stage 3a Circuit des Mines, Sergiy Matveyev
Giro dell'Appennino, Giuliano Figueras
Stages 13 & 16 Giro d'Italia, Julio Alberto Pérez
Gran Premio Industria e Commercio di Prato, Vladimir Duma

2003 – Ceramiche Panaria–Fiordo

Stage 6 Tour Down Under, Graeme Brown
Stages 5 & 7 Tour de Langkawi, Graeme Brown
Stage 10 Tour de Langkawi, Guillermo Bongiorno
Gran Premio di Chiasso, Giuliano Figueras
Stage 4 Settimana Internazionale di Coppi e Bartali, Luca Mazzanti
Overall Settimana Lombarda, Julio Alberto Pérez
Stage 2, Julio Alberto Pérez
 Time Trial Championships, Sergiy Matveyev
Casalincontrada-Blockhaus, Claudio Bartoli

2004 – Ceramiche Panaria–Margres

Stage 3 Tour de Langkawi, Brett Lancaster
Stage 10 Tour de Langkawi, Guillermo Bongiorno
Overall Settimana Internazionale di Coppi e Bartali, Giuliano Figueras
Stage 11 Giro d'Italia, Emanuele Sella
Stage 2a Brixia Tour, Julio Alberto Pérez
Trofeo Città di Castelfidardo, Emanuele Sella
Firenze–Pistoia, Sergiy Matveyev
3rd Stage 6 Giro d'Italia, Alejandro Borrajo

2005 – Ceramica Panaria–Navigare

Stages 1, 5, 7, 9 & 10, Tour de Langkawi, Graeme Brown
Stages 2 & 6, Guillermo Bongiorno
Stage 1a Settimana Internazionale di Coppi e Bartali, Guillermo Bongiorno
Giro della Provincia di Reggio Calabria, Guillermo Bongiorno
Stage 1 Settimana Lombarda, Guillermo Bongiorno
Stage 4 Settimana Lombarda, Fredy González
Giro d'Oro, Luca Mazzanti
Overall Giro del Trentino, Julio Alberto Pérez
Stage 5 Circuit de Lorraine, Paride Grillo
GP Industria & Artigianato, Luca Mazzanti
Prologue (ITT) Giro d'Italia, Brett Lancaster
Stage 4 Giro d'Italia, Luca Mazzanti
Overall Brixia Tour, Emanuele Sella
Stage 2a, Guillermo Bongiorno
Stage 2b, Emanuele Sella
Stage 4 Tour of Denmark, Paride Grillo
Gran Premio Fred Mengoni, Luca Mazzanti
Stage 1 Regio-Tour, Guillermo Bongiorno
Gran Premio Città di Misano – Adriatico, Guillermo Bongiorno
Firenze–Pistoia, Sergiy Matveyev

2006 – Ceramica Panaria–Navigare

Stage 1 Tour de Langkawi, Maximiliano Richeze
Stage 2 Tour de Langkawi, Guillermo Bongiorno
Stage 9 Tour de Langkawi, Sergiy Matveyev
Grand Prix de Rennes, Paride Grillo
Stage 2 Circuit de la Sarthe, Paride Grillo
Stage 1 Giro del Trentino, Luca Mazzanti
Stage 14 Giro d'Italia, Luis Felipe Laverde
Subida al Naranco, Fortunato Baliani
Stage 4 Brixia Tour, Paride Grillo
Stage 1 Tour de Wallonie, Aitor Galdós
Stage 1 Tour of Denmark, Aitor Galdós

2007 – Ceramica Panaria–Navigare

Stage 2 Tour de Langkawi, Maximiliano Richeze
Gran Premio di Lugano, Luca Mazzanti
Grand Prix de Rennes, Sergiy Matveyev
Stage 2 Circuit de la Sarthe, Paride Grillo
Stage 4 Giro del Trentino, Maximiliano Richeze
Stage 6 Giro d'Italia, Luis Felipe Laverde
Stage 2 Circuit de Lorraine, Matteo Priamo
Stage 1 Tour de Luxembourg, Maximiliano Richeze
Stage 2b Brixia Tour, Emanuele Sella
Stages 1 & 7 Volta a Portugal, Paride Grillo
Gran Premio Città di Camaiore, Fortunato Baliani
Gran Premio Nobili Rubinetterie, Luis Felipe Laverde

2008 – CSF Group–Navigare

Stage 2 Tour de San Luis, Maximiliano Richeze
Stage 8 Tour de Langkawi, Filippo Savini
Stage 9 Tour de Langkawi, Mauro Richeze
Stage 5 Settimana Internazionale di Coppi e Bartali, Emanuele Sella
Stage 5 Circuit de la Sarthe, Maximiliano Richeze
Stage 1 Presidential Cycling Tour of Turkey, Guillermo Bongiorno
Stages 3 & 5 Presidential Cycling Tour of Turkey, Matteo Priamo
Stage 4 Presidential Cycling Tour of Turkey, Filippo Savini
Stages 6 & 7 Presidential Cycling Tour of Turkey, Maximiliano Richeze
Stage 6 Giro d'Italia, Matteo Priamo
Stages 14, 15 & 20 Giro d'Italia, Emanuele Sella
 Mountains classification in the Giro d'Italia, Emanuele Sella
Team classification Giro d'Italia
Stages 1 & 4 Tour of Denmark, Guillermo Bongiorno

2009 – CSF Group–Navigare

Stage 2 Giro della Provincia di Grosseto, Marco Frapporti
Stages 1 & 6 Presidential Cycling Tour of Turkey, Mauro Finetto
Stage 5 Settimana Ciclistica Lombarda, Domenico Pozzovivo
Hel van het Mergelland, Mauro Finetto
Giro della Provincia di Reggio Calabria, Fortunato Baliani

2010 – Colnago–CSF Inox

Stage 2 Settimana Lombarda, Mattia Gavazzi
Stage 4 Giro del Trentino, Domenico Pozzovivo
Stage 13 Giro d'Italia, Manuel Belletti
Gran Premio Nobili Rubinetterie, Gianluca Brambilla
Overall Brixia Tour, Domenico Pozzovivo
Stages 2 & 4, Domenico Pozzovivo
Coppa Bernocchi, Manuel Belletti
Stage 5 Tour of Britain, Marco Frapporti

2011 – Colnago–CSF Inox

Stage 3 Giro della Provincia di Reggio Calabria, Manuel Belletti
Stage 1 Settimana Internazionale di Coppi e Bartali, Manuel Belletti
Stage 3 Vuelta a Castilla y León, Filippo Savini
Stage 3 Presidential Cycling Tour of Turkey, Manuel Belletti
Stages 5 & 9 Tour of Qinghai Lake, Sacha Modolo
Stage 1 Brixia Tour, Marco Frapporti
Stage 3 Brixia Tour, Manuel Belletti
Stage 4 Brixia Tour, Domenico Pozzovivo
Stage 5 Brixia Tour, Sacha Modolo
Stages 1 & 4 Danmark Rundt, Sacha Modolo
Coppa Ugo Agostoni, Sacha Modolo
Stages 2 & 3 Settimana Lombarda, Sacha Modolo
Stages 1 & 3 Giro di Padania, Sacha Modolo

2012 – Colnago–CSF Bardiani

Stage 7 Tour de Langkawi, Marco Canola
Overall Giro del Trentino, Domenico Pozzovivo
Stage 3, Domenico Pozzovivo
Stage 5 Tour of Turkey, Andrea Di Corrado
Stage 6 Tour of Turkey, Sacha Modolo
Stage 8 Giro d'Italia, Domenico Pozzovivo
Stage 3 Tour of Slovenia, Domenico Pozzovivo
Stages 3 & 6 Tour of Austria, Sacha Modolo
Coppa Bernocchi, Sacha Modolo
Stage 1b Monviso-Venezia — Il Padania, Team time trial
Stage 2 Monviso-Venezia — Il Padania, Sacha Modolo

2013 – Bardiani Valvole–CSF Inox

Stage 2 Tour de San Luis, Sacha Modolo
Stage 4 Giro d'Italia, Enrico Battaglin
 Mountains classification in the Giro d'Italia, Stefano Pirazzi
Stages 1, 4, 8, 9, 11 & 12 Tour of Qinghai Lake, Sacha Modolo
Stage 2 Tour du Limousin, Andrea Pasqualon
Coppa Bernocchi, Sacha Modolo
Memorial Marco Pantani, Sacha Modolo

2014 – Bardiani–CSF

Stage 2 Giro del Trentino, Edoardo Zardini
Stage 13 Giro d'Italia, Marco Canola
Stage 14 Giro d'Italia, Enrico Battaglin
Stage 17 Giro d'Italia, Stefano Pirazzi
Stage 2 Tour of Slovenia, Sonny Colbrelli
Stage 3 Tour of Slovenia, Francesco Bongiorno
Giro dell'Appennino, Sonny Colbrelli
Stage 6 Danmark Rundt, Nicola Boem
Stage 3 Tour du Poitou-Charentes, Nicola Ruffoni
Stage 3 Tour of Britain, Edoardo Zardini
Memorial Marco Pantani, Sonny Colbrelli
Coppa Sabatini, Sonny Colbrelli

2015 – Bardiani–CSF

Stage 10 Giro d'Italia, Nicola Boem
Overall Tour du Limousin, Sonny Colbrelli
Stage 1, Sonny Colbrelli
Gran Premio Bruno Beghelli, Sonny Colbrelli

2016 – Bardiani–CSF

Gran Premio di Lugano, Sonny Colbrelli
Stage 4 Settimana Internazionale di Coppi e Bartali, Stefano Pirazzi
Stage 10 Giro d'Italia, Giulio Ciccone
Stages 1 & 6 Tour of Austria, Nicola Ruffoni
Stage 5 Tour of Austria, Simone Sterbini
Stage 5 Tour du Poitou-Charentes, Sonny Colbrelli
Stages 3 & 4 Tour du Limousin, Sonny Colbrelli
Coppa Ugo Agostoni, Sonny Colbrelli
Coppa Sabatini, Sonny Colbrelli
Gran Premio Bruno Beghelli, Nicola Ruffoni

2017 – Bardiani–CSF

Stage 6 Tour de Langkawi, Enrico Barbin
Stage 6 Tour of Utah, Giulio Ciccone

2018 – Bardiani–CSF
Overall International Tour of Rhodes, Mirco Maestri
Stage 1, Mirco Maestri
Stages 1 & 8 Le Tour de Langkawi, Andrea Guardini
Stage 4 Tour of Croatia, Alessandro Tonelli
Stage 6 Tour of Croatia, Paolo Simion
Giro dell'Appennino, Giulio Ciccone
Stage 2 Tour du Limousin, Luca Wackermann

2019 – Bardiani–CSF
Stage 3 Istrian Spring Trophy, Andrea Guardini
Stage 10 Tour of Qinghai Lake, Andrea Guardini
Stage 2 Tour of China I, Mirco Maestri

2020 – Bardiani–CSF
Stage 2 Tour of Antalya, Giovanni Lonardi

2021 – Bardiani–CSF–Faizanè
Grand Prix Alanya, Davide Gabburo
Poreč Trophy, Filippo Fiorelli
Stage 2 Istrian Spring Trophy, Filippo Zana
GP Slovenian Istria, Mirco Maestri
GP Slovenia, Mirco Maestri
Stage 1 Tour of Bulgaria, Giovanni Lonardi
 Overall Czech Cycling Tour, Filippo Zana

2022 – Bardiani–CSF–Faizanè
Grand Prix Alanya, Alessio Martinelli
Trofeo Piva, Alessio Martinelli
Stage 4 (ITT) Carpathian Couriers Race, Alessio Martinelli
Gran Premio Industrie del Marmo, Alessio Martinelli
 Overall Adriatica Ionica Race, Filippo Zana
 Road Race Championships, Filippo Zana
Stage 1 Sibiu Cycling Tour, Filippo Fiorelli

2023 – Green Project–Bardiani CSF–Faizanè
 Overall Tour du Rwanda, Henok Mulubrhan
Stages 3 & 8, Henok Mulubrhan
Stage 7, Manuele Tarozzi

Supplementary statistics
Sources

1982 to 2002

2003 to 2023

Notes

References

Termolan
Ter